Tom Monroe (September 2, 1919 – December 2, 1993) was an American actor. He appeared in more than one hundred films from 1946 to 1977.

Filmography

References

External links 

1919 births
1993 deaths
American male film actors
20th-century American male actors